The Gela river is located in Sicily. It originates from the Disueri lake and, after about 59 kilometers, flows into the Strait of Sicily of the Mediterranean Sea, near the town Gela.

Overview
The extension of the basin of the river is about 569 square kilometers.

Giozzo and Maroglio are its main tributary rivers.

The name Gela (Γέλα) may come from the Greek verb γελάω "I smile/laugh".

Notes

Rivers of the Province of Caltanissetta
Rivers of Sicily
Gela
Rivers of Italy
European drainage basins of the Mediterranean Sea